Kyle Parrott (born 13 September 1985) is a Canadian long track speed skater.

He competed at the 2010 Winter Olympics in Vancouver in the men's 500 metre, 1000 metre and 1500 metre competitions.

References

External links
Kyle Parrott at the 2010 Winter Olympics

1985 births
Living people
Canadian male speed skaters
Speed skaters at the 2010 Winter Olympics
Olympic speed skaters of Canada
Sportspeople from Brandon, Manitoba
21st-century Canadian people